Lenny Thomas (11 March 1918 – 29 May 1973) was a Guyanese cricketer. He played in thirteen first-class matches for British Guiana from 1936 to 1953.

See also
 List of Guyanese representative cricketers

References

External links
 

1918 births
1973 deaths
Guyanese cricketers
Guyana cricketers
Sportspeople from Georgetown, Guyana